Josu Esnaola Atxega (born 31 October 1986) is a Spanish professional footballer who plays as a left back or a central defender.

Club career
Born in Orio, Gipuzkoa, Esnaola made his debut as a senior with Universidad del Pais Vasco CF. In summer 2006 he moved to Real Sociedad, being assigned to the reserves in Segunda División B.

In the 2009 off-season, Esnaola was promoted to the Txuri-urdin first team who competed in Segunda División. He played his first match as a professional on 27 February 2010, starting in a 1–1 away draw against SD Huesca.

In August 2010, Esnaola was loaned to Real Unión in the third level. He was released by the club in January of the following year, subsequently returning to Real. In April, he moved to Tercera División's UD Lanzarote also in a temporary deal.

In July 2011, Esnaola joined SD Noja also in the fourth division. After two seasons (the first ending in promotion), he signed for Sestao River Club.

On 16 July 2014, Esnaola moved to another side in division three, Real Unión.

References

External links
Real Unión official profile 

1986 births
Living people
Spanish footballers
Footballers from the Basque Country (autonomous community)
Association football defenders
Segunda División players
Segunda División B players
Tercera División players
Real Sociedad B footballers
Real Sociedad footballers
Real Unión footballers
Sestao River footballers